Sir William Murray Gallagher  (born 22 January 1941) is a New Zealand businessman.

Biography
Gallagher was born on 22 January 1941, the son of Bill Gallagher and Millie Gallagher (née Murray). His father was an inventor, engineer and businessman who is best remembered for popularising the electric fence; he founded Gallagher Engineering Limited in Hamilton in 1963.

The younger Bill Gallagher and his brother John took increasing roles in the business and marketing side of the family firm through the 1960s, with Bill leading the company's export push into Australia and becoming the chief executive in the mid 1970s. By 2010, the Gallagher Group was exporting to over 130 countries with revenue of $160 million, and had over 1000 employees, including 600 in New Zealand. Their product range had expanded to include high-powered electric fences, automatic gate openers, security access systems, and animal weighing devices.

Gallagher and his wife, Judi, have three children.

Hamilton statue controversy
In 2013, the Gallagher Group donated to Hamilton City a statue of John Fane Charles Hamilton, a British naval officer who was killed at the Battle of Gate Pā, for whom the city was named. In 2017, Gallagher gave a speech in which he called the Treaty of Waitangi a "fraud", and said that non-Māori risked being stripped of their rights and becoming unable to visit New Zealand's beaches. In 2018, the statue of Hamilton was defaced with red paint, and it was removed from public display in Civic Square by the Hamilton City Council in 2020 following a request from the local iwi, Waikato Tainui. Gallagher subsequently circulated reports to city councillors detailing an alternative history of New Zealand in which Māori were not the first inhabitants of New Zealand, a theory that has been debunked by leading historians.

Honours and awards
In the 1987 Queen's Birthday Honours, Gallagher was appointed a Member of the Order of the British Empire, for services to export. In 1990, he was awarded the New Zealand 1990 Commemoration Medal. In the 1999 New Year Honours, Gallagher was made a Companion of the New Zealand Order of Merit, for services to business and export, and he was promoted to Knight Companion of the New Zealand Order of Merit, for services to business, in the 2011 New Year Honours. In 2004, he was inducted into the New Zealand Business Hall of Fame.

In 2008, Gallagher and his brother John both received honorary doctorates from the University of Waikato.

References

1941 births
Living people
People from Hamilton, New Zealand
New Zealand businesspeople
New Zealand Members of the Order of the British Empire
Knights Companion of the New Zealand Order of Merit